Bertha Hodges Cook (March 29, 1895 – March 9, 1990) was an American handicraft artist who was known primarily for her needlework using Colonial knotting and fringing techniques to make bedspreads. 

Cook was a recipient of a 1984 National Heritage Fellowship awarded by the National Endowment for the Arts, which is the highest honor in the folk and traditional arts in the United States.

Early life 
Bertha Hodges was born in the Blue Ridge Mountain community of Sands, North Carolina, near Boone. Her mother was Carrie Hodges, a well-regarded bedspread artist who had learned the skill from her English and Irish female ancestors. Both women used as patterns bedspreads over 100 years old that had been passed down and carefully preserved from one generation to the next. As a child, Cook accompanied her mother to Southern Highland Craft Guild fairs, where she learned about Colonial knotting and fringing techniques to make bedspreads and pillows. Her mother and grandmother served as mentors when Cook began to work on her own.

Career 
Cook began making the knotted designs at an early age, but she initially feared learning the complex tying process that resulted in the bedspread's fringe. At age 16, she married Daniel Webster Cook, and they had two children by the time she was 18 years old. Needing money to help support her growing family, and with the strong encouragement of her mother, Cook learned how to tie the fringe so that she could complete each work. She quickly became very proficient as an artisan, and at the height of her career she would make one bedspread a week.

The Cooks eventually had six children, and as soon as the children were old enough, she taught them to knot and tie so they could help her with the work. Over the years, Cook made more than a thousand bedspreads, as well as pillows and shams, curtains, table runners and table cloths. The money she made selling her bedspreads and other finished pieces substantially contributed to the family finances, and helped pay for automobiles, a new refrigerator, and a replacement well on the family property.

The patterns passed along within her family included Bird in the Tree, Rose of Sharon, Bowknot and Thistle, Napoleon Wreath, and Sunflower. Cook's personal contribution to the family repertoire was called the Grape Wreath or Grapevine, which became her specialty. She would improvise the leaf shapes as she worked, noting that in nature no two leaves are identical, but she never veered very far from her family traditions.

Cook's work was recognized in the Appalachian region for her "exceptional skill and artistry". She joined the Southern Highland Handicraft Guild in 1951. For several decades, she traveled to fairs and art shows to demonstrate and sell her work.

Technique 
Her technique has been described as follows:

Legacy 
One of Cook's knotted bedspreads is included in the permanent collection of the Southern Highland Craft Guild. Her work was also included in the same organization's 2020 special exhibit titled "The Power of Distinction".

Photographs of her work are also included in the "Knotted Bedspread Collection" 1970–1974, created by scholar Thomas A. McGowan and housed by the Special Collections Research Center at Appalachian State University.

Cook's children became skilled artists as well, and carried on the tradition into their adulthoods. Cook also taught North Carolina artist Carmelee Craig the colonial knotting techniques that she had learned from her female relatives.

Awards and honors 
 1952: Southern Highland Handicraft Guild, Excellence of Design Award
 1967: North Carolina State Fair, invited artist
 1973: North Carolina Folklore Society, Brown-Hudson Folklore Award
 1973: Southern Highland Handicraft Guild's Lifetime membership award
 1984: National Endowment for the Arts, National Heritage Fellowship

References

External links 
 Bertha Hodges Cook at Find a Grave

1895 births
1990 deaths
People from Watauga County, North Carolina
American women artists
20th-century American women artists
American textile artists
American people of English descent
American people of Irish descent
National Heritage Fellowship winners